José Alberto López Menéndez (born 21 May 1982), known as José Alberto, is a Spanish football manager and former player who played as a defender, who is currently in charge of Racing de Santander.

Career
Born in Oviedo, Asturias, José Alberto started his career at Astur CF's youth setup in 2001 (later renamed Oviedo ACF); at that time, he was playing as a senior for Tercera División side SDR San Lázaro, but retired shortly after. In 2006 he took over CD Vallobín's under-19 squad, but returned to Astur in the following year.

In 2008, José Alberto moved to Sporting de Gijón, being named assistant manager of the under-14s. He was appointed manager of the under-13 team in the following year, and subsequently took over the under-14s.

On 12 October 2013, José Alberto was named manager of Tercera División side CD Covadonga, and led the side to fifth position during the campaign, one point shy of the play-offs. He resigned the following 19 May, and returned to Sporting on 2 June.

On 9 June 2016, José Alberto was appointed manager of the reserves, freshly relegated to the fourth division. He achieved promotion to Segunda División B in his first season, and reached the play-offs to Segunda División in his second.

On 18 November 2018, José Alberto replaced Rubén Baraja at the helm of the first team. His first match in charge occurred five days later, a 2–1 away win against Granada CF. He was sacked on 21 December 2019, after two losses against fourth-tier Zamora CF in the Copa del Rey, and Extremadura UD.

On 27 July 2020, José Alberto was appointed in charge of CD Mirandés, still in the second division. The following 1 June, he was named in charge of fellow league team Málaga CF.

On 24 January 2022, after a 5–0 home loss to UD Ibiza, José Alberto was dismissed by the Andalusians. On 13 December, he replaced sacked Guillermo Fernández Romo at the helm of Racing de Santander, still in division two.

Personal life
José Alberto's younger brother Dani was a footballer. A left back, he was a Real Oviedo youth graduate.

Managerial statistics

Honours

Manager
Sporting de Gijón B
Tercera División: 2016–17

References

External links
José Alberto profile at BDFutbol
José Alberto manager profile at BDFutbol

1982 births
Living people
Footballers from Oviedo
Spanish footballers
Association football defenders
Tercera División players
Spanish football managers
Segunda División managers
Segunda División B managers
Tercera División managers
Sporting de Gijón managers
CD Mirandés managers
Málaga CF managers
Racing de Santander managers